Poo Poova Poothirukku is a 1987 Indian Tamil-language film directed by V. Azhagappan and produced by Kaveri Manoharan. The film stars Prabhu, Saritha and Amala. It was released on 18 September 1987.

Plot 

Ramu and Janaki are a happily married couple and have two children. Ramu, however, is unfaithful to his wife; he a secret relationship with Mary in Andaman and she gives birth to his son Kannan. Years later, Marry dies in a car accident, and Ramu reveals the truth to his wife. The rest of the film deals with the aftermath.

Cast 
Prabhu
Saritha
Amala

Production 
Poo Poova Poothirukku was directed by V. Azhagappan, who also wrote the screenplay. The film was produced by Kaveri Manoharan under My Productions. Cinematography was handled by K. B. Dayalan, and the editing by V. Rajagopal.

Soundtrack 
The soundtrack was composed by T. Rajendar, who also wrote the lyrics.

Release and reception 
Poo Poova Poothirukku was released on 18 September 1988. N. Krishnaswamy of The Indian Express called the film "somewhat of a drag" and noted its similarities to Man, Woman and Child (1983), but praised the performances of Prabhu, Sarita and the child artistes.

References

External links 
 

1980s Tamil-language films
1987 drama films
Films about infidelity
Films directed by V. Azhagappan
Films scored by T. Rajendar
Indian drama films